Nhundiaquara River is a river located in the Serra do Mar, on the coast of Paraná in Brazil.

Nhundiaquara was first natural route linking the coast to the state plateaus. It  was originally named Cubatão, being considered the richest gold river.

See also
 List of rivers of Paraná

Rivers of Paraná (state)